The 2013 Heineken Open was a tennis tournament played on outdoor hard courts. It was the 38th edition of the Heineken Open, and was part of the ATP World Tour 250 series of the 2013 ATP World Tour. It took place at the ASB Tennis Centre in Auckland, New Zealand, from January 7 to 12, 2013.

Singles main-draw entrants

Seeds

 Rankings as of December 31, 2012.

Other entrants
The following players received wildcards into the singles main draw:
  Daniel King-Turner
  Gaël Monfils 
  Olivier Rochus

The following players received entry into the singles main draw through qualifying:
  Benjamin Becker
  Greg Jones
  Jesse Levine
  Igor Sijsling

Withdrawals
Before the tournament
  Mardy Fish (heart problem)

Retirements
  Grega Žemlja (illness)

Doubles main-draw entrants

Seeds

 Rankings are as of December 31, 2012.

Other entrants
The following pairs received wildcards into the doubles main draw:
  Daniel King-Turner /  Michael Venus
  Artem Sitak /  Jose Statham

Withdrawals
During the tournament
  Frank Moser (back injury)

Finals

Singles

 David Ferrer defeated  Philipp Kohlschreiber, 7–6(7–5), 6–1
It was Ferrer's 1st title of the year and 19th of his career.

Doubles

 Colin Fleming /  Bruno Soares defeated  Johan Brunström /  Frederik Nielsen, 7–6(7–1), 7–6(7–2)

See also
 2013 ASB Classic – women's tournament

References

External links 
Official website